Astragalus campylanthus is a species of milkvetch in the family Fabaceae.

References

campylanthus
Taxa named by Pierre Edmond Boissier